The 2008 Speedway Grand Prix of Denmark will be the fourth race of the 2008 Speedway Grand Prix season. It took place on June 14 in the Parken Stadium in Copenhagen, Denmark.

Copenhagen is also the second of four rounds of the 2008 Super Prix. The meeting winner will be given the blue helmet in the Super Prix Final at Gelsenkirchen in October with a chance of winning a share of an extra $200,000 prize fund.

Riders 
The Speedway Grand Prix Commission nominated Kenneth Bjerre as a wild card, and Nicolai Klindt and Patrick Hougaard both as track reserves. The draw was made on June 2 at the FIM Headquarters in Mies, Switzerland.

Result 
Tomasz Gollob was the winner at Parken and became the first rider to win two Grand Prix rounds in 2008. He won the final from Nicki Pedersen, Jason Crump and Hans N. Andersen. The result kept Nicki Pedersen at the top of the World Championship standings, eleven points ahead of nearest rival Gollob. Danish wild card entry Kenneth Bjerre reached the semi finals and finished in fifth position.

Heat details

Heat after heat 
 Jonsson, Hancock, B.Pedersen, Lindgren
 Andersen, Bjerre, Crump, Nicholls
 Adams, Gollob, Holta, Dryml
 N.Pedersen, Harris, Iversen, Kasprzak
 N.Pedersen, B.Pedersen, Nicholls, Dryml
 Hancock, Holta, Andersen, Iversen
 Bjerre, Adams, Lindgren, Kasprzak
 Crump, Gollob, Jonsson, Harris
 B.Pedersen, Andersen, Harris, Adams
 Gollob, Nicholls, Hancock, Kasprzak
 Crump, Iversen, Klindt, Dryml (M/-), Lindgren (X/F2) Drryml collides with Lindgren in spectacular crash. Lindgren excluded for restart. Dryml's bike fails to start before end of time limit, he is excluded. replaced by Nicolai Klindt. 
 N.Pedersen, Jonsson, Holta, Bjerre
 Bjerre, Iversen, Gollob, B.Pedersen
 Crump, N.Pedersen, Hancock, Adams
 Holta, Nicholls, Lindgren, Harris
 Andersen, Jonsson, Kasprzak, Dryml
 Crump, Kasprzak, B.Pedersen, Holta
 Bjerre, Hancock, Dryml, Harris
 N.Pedersen, Gollob, Lindgren, Andersen
 Adams, Nicholls, Iversen, Jonsson
 Semi-Finals:
 Gollob, N.Pedersen, Hancock, Adams
 Crump, Andersen, Jonsson, Bjerre
 Final:
 Gollob (6), N.Pedersen (4), Crump (2), Andersen (0)

The intermediate classification

See also 
 Speedway Grand Prix
 List of Speedway Grand Prix riders

References

External links 
 www.SpeedwayWorld.tv

Denmark
2008
2008 in Danish motorsport